New England's First Fruits was a book published in London in 1643 about the early evangelization efforts by the Puritans in colonial New England in defense of criticisms from England that little evangelism was being pursued in New England. It was the first publication to mention Harvard College.

Content
The book describes various evangelization efforts and results, including the conversion experience of Wequash Cooke (d.1642) as allegedly the first Native American conversion to Protestant Christianity in New England. The book also describes the conversion of Dorcas ye blackmore, an early African slave to Israel Stoughton, who joined the First Parish Church of Dorchester in 1641 and evangelized her fellow Native American servants and eventually attempted to gained her freedom with the help of the local church.

Response
Roger Williams' A Key Into the Language of America was written partially to contradict the book's claims about successful evangelization in New England, particularly the alleged conversion of Wequash.

References

External links
New England's First Fruits: With Divers Other Special Matters Concerning that Country (1865) 

1643 books
17th-century Christian texts
History books about the United States
Harvard University
Evangelism